is a Tokyo Sakura Tram station located in Toshima, Tokyo, Japan.

Lines
Tokyo Sakura Tram

References

Railway stations in Tokyo